Daltoniaceae is a family of moss in the order Hookeriales.

Taxonomy

Family Daltoniaceae contains the following genera:

 Achrophyllum  
 Adelothecium 
 Beeveria 
 Benitotania 
 Bryobrothera 
 Calyptrochaeta 
 Crosbya 
 Daltonia 
 Distichophyllidium 
 Distichophyllum 
 Ephemeropsis  
 Leskeodon 
 Leskeodontopsis 
 Metadistichophyllum

References 

Moss families
Hookeriales